Don Juan in a Girls' School is a 1928 German silent comedy film directed by and starring Reinhold Schünzel. It is based on Hans Stürm's play The Unfaithful Eckehart.

The film's art direction was by Gustav A. Knauer and Willy Schiller.

Two later film versions were The Unfaithful Eckehart (1931) and The Unfaithful Eckehart (1940).

Cast
In alphabetical order
Ernst Behmer as Studienrat Meisel
Adolphe Engers as Fritz Stürmer
Carl Geppert as Studienrat Schäden
Else Groß as Mädchen für alles bei Susanne Bach
Max Gülstorff as Oberstudienrat Arminius Niedlich
Julius E. Herrmann as Sala Mander
Carola Höhn
Valerie Jones as Eva
Maria Kamradek as Susanne Bach
Lydia Potechina as Frau Tiedemann
F. W. Schröder-Schrom
Reinhold Schünzel as Dr. Eckehart Bleibtreu
Lotte Stein as Perle im Hause Bleibtreu
Jakob Tiedtke as Herr Tiedemann
Rolf von Goth as Prinz Osram
Hilde von Stolz as Trude

References

External links

Films of the Weimar Republic
German silent feature films
Films directed by Reinhold Schünzel
1928 comedy films
German comedy films
Films set in schools
German films based on plays
German black-and-white films
Silent comedy films
1920s German films
1920s German-language films